Whiteclay Lake is a lake in Thunder Bay District in northern Ontario, Canada.

See also
List of lakes in Ontario

References
 National Resources Canada

Lakes of Thunder Bay District